Dunreith is a town in Spiceland Township, Henry County, Indiana, United States. The population was 177 at the 2010 census.

History
Dunreith was originally called Coffin's Station, and under the latter name was platted in 1865 by Emery Dunreith Coffin.

Geography
Dunreith is located at  (39.802940, -85.436849).

Notable person
Actress/playwright/lyricist Gretchen Cryer, mother of actor Jon, was born and raised in Dunreith.

Demographics

2010 census
As of the census of 2010, there were 177 people, 78 households, and 54 families living in the town. The racial makeup of the town was 88.1% White, 0.6% African American, 0.6% Native American, 2.8% Asian, 5.1% from other races, and 2.8% from two or more races. Hispanic or Latino of any race were 4.5% of the population.

There were 78 households, of which 25.6% had children under the age of 18 living with them, 51.3% were married couples living together, 12.8% had a female householder with no husband present, 5.1% had a male householder with no wife present, and 30.8% were non-families. 25.6% of all households were made up of individuals, and 12.9% had someone living alone who was 65 years of age or older. The average household size was 2.27 and the average family size was 2.69.

The median age in the town was 46.5 years. 17.5% of residents were under the age of 18; 10.2% were between the ages of 18 and 24; 20.4% were from 25 to 44; 33.3% were from 45 to 64; and 18.6% were 65 years of age or older. The gender makeup of the town was 47.5% male and 52.5% female.

2000 census
As of the census of 2000, there were 184 people, 75 households, and 62 families living in the town. The racial makeup of the town was 100.00% White. Hispanic or Latino of any race were 1.09% of the population.

There were 75 households, out of which 28.0% had children under the age of 18 living with them, 64.0% were married couples living together, 10.7% had a female householder with no husband present, and 17.3% were non-families. 17.3% of all households were made up of individuals, and 12.0% had someone living alone who was 65 years of age or older. The average household size was 2.45 and the average family size was 2.68.

In the town, the population was spread out, with 17.9% under the age of 18, 9.2% from 18 to 24, 28.3% from 25 to 44, 26.6% from 45 to 64, and 17.9% who were 65 years of age or older. The median age was 42 years. For every 100 females, there were 104.4 males. For every 100 females age 18 and over, there were 101.3 males.

The median income for a household in the town was $39,250, and the median income for a family was $44,688. Males had a median income of $40,781 versus $25,357 for females. The per capita income for the town was $20,697. About 1.8% of families and 4.7% of the population were below the poverty line, including none of those under the age of eighteen and 12.5% of those 65 or over.

1968 blaze
In 1968, 250 residents of Dunreith had to be evacuated for 48 hours after two freight trains sideswiped, releasing flammable and poisonous liquids that resulted in a major fire and a huge explosion. The fire destroyed a cannery and seven houses; cyanide pollution of the water persisted for several months.

References

Towns in Henry County, Indiana
Towns in Indiana